Mary Park Wilson House, also known as "Old Stone House Farm" and "Oban Hall," is a historic home located near Gerrardstown, Berkeley County, West Virginia.  It was built in 1825 by William Wilson for his wife Mary Park Wilson.  The Federal style, rubble stone house has two sections: a three bay, two-story central block with a three-bay, two-story wing.  The central block measures 52 feet wide by 21 feet deep.  The wing features a two-story recessed porch.  The property was purchased in 1952, by Archibald McDougall who named it "Oban Hall."

It was listed on the National Register of Historic Places in 1985.

References

Federal architecture in West Virginia
Houses completed in 1825
Houses in Berkeley County, West Virginia
Houses on the National Register of Historic Places in West Virginia
National Register of Historic Places in Berkeley County, West Virginia
Stone houses in West Virginia